Paul Johnson (born 24 April 1965) is a former English cricketer. He was a right-handed batsman and a right-arm medium-pace bowler. He is most well known for a 21-year career with Nottinghamshire. He was also the club's captain between 1996 and 1998.

Career 
Having appeared for the Nottinghamshire second XI as early as 1981, Johnson appeared in three Youth Test matches between 1982 and 1983, scoring a half-century in his second Youth test. During this time, he continued to perform consistently for Nottinghamshire. Amongst Johnson's accolades are victories in the 1993 and 1995 Tetley Bitter cup.

Johnson was a player whose talent was not reflected by his career statistics. He would lose his wicket to the worst bowlers but play innings of brilliance against the best.

Johnson retired from cricket in 2002, two years before Nottinghamshire's year-long stint in the Second Division in 2004.

1965 births
English cricketers
Living people
Nottinghamshire cricketers
Nottinghamshire cricket captains
Test and County Cricket Board Under-25s XI cricketers